Electoral district of Maryborough may refer to:

 Maryborough (Parliament of Ireland constituency)
 Electoral district of Maryborough and Talbot
 Electoral district of Maryborough and Daylesford
 Electoral district of Maryborough (Victoria)
 Electoral district of Maryborough (Queensland)